Michael Edward Parlane (born 22 July 1972) is a New Zealand cricketer. He played 64 first-class matches for Northern Districts before shifting to Wellington to extend his first-class career. He was born in Pukekohe. He is the older brother of Neal Parlane.

Michael Parlane also played for Northland in the Hawke Cup.

References

External links
 

1972 births
Living people
New Zealand cricketers
Northern Districts cricketers
Wellington cricketers
Norfolk cricketers